A referendum on the Treaty establishing a Constitution for Europe was held in Spain on Sunday, 20 February 2005. The question asked was "Do you approve of the Treaty establishing a Constitution for Europe?". The consultative referendum on ratification of the proposed Constitution for the European Union was approved by 81.8% of valid votes, although turnout was just 41.8%, the lowest since the end of the Franco era.

The referendum was not legally binding on the government, but paved the way for parliamentary ratification of the constitutional treaty, which happened in the Congress of Deputies on 28 April 2005, with a 319–19 result in favour of approval, and in the Spanish Senate on 18 May 2005 with a 225–6 result.

Campaign

Both the governing Spanish Socialist Workers' Party (PSOE) and the main opposition People's Party (PP) campaigned for a "Yes" vote. They were joined by the Basque Nationalist Party (EAJ–PNV) and the Catalan nationalist Convergence and Union (CiU). Among the parties campaigning for a "No" vote were United Left (IU), the Bloque Nacionalista Galego (BNG, Galician National Block), Republican Left of Catalonia (ERC), Initiative for Catalonia Greens (ICV), the social democratic Aragonese Council (CHA), the Basque nationalist social democratic Eusko Alkartasuna, and the Trade Unions Confederación Intersindical Galega (CIG) and CGT.

Amidst widespread apathy surrounding the constitutional treaty, and ignorance of its contents (in a government poll, 90% of voters admitted to having little or no knowledge of its provisions), the government hired celebrities to read excerpts from the text in daily television broadcasts, and five million copies (without annexes) were sent out with Sunday papers. While many felt that the result of the referendum was a foregone conclusion, it was feared that turnout could be as low as 40 to 50% of the electorate. This turned out to be the case.

In late January 2005, several bodies campaigning for a "No" vote complained to Spain's independent National Electoral Commission about the government's planned information campaign:

On 14 January, ERC demanded that the National Electoral Commission should block what it saw as unfair promotion of the treaty by the government.
On 19 January, the Tomás Moro Centre for Juridical Studies (CJSTM) and Another Democracy is Possible complained to the National Electoral Commission about what they saw as the unfair nature of the government's campaign.

In response to these complaints, the Commission ruled that the government's campaign must be purely informative, and banned several of its campaign slogans:

The campaign to be carried out by the Government as part of the present referendum process must inform objectively on the contents of the Treaty… All value judgements and slogans previously used in TV, on websites and other media, e.g. 'We are first with Europe', and statements that could, direct or indirectly, influence the position or attitude of the citizens, must be removed.

Results

Overall

Results by region

References

External links
Election results (in Spanish)
Government's European Constitution site (in Spanish)
Government's online forum (in Spanish)
 News coverage:
BBC: Spain's hard sell to win EU Yes
BBC: Madrid voters differ over charter
BBC: Spain voters approve EU charter
CNN: Spain voters back EU constitution
BBC: Spain gives uncertain lead to EU
EUbusiness: Zapatero calls for stronger Europe as Spaniards kick off EU votes
EUbusiness: Spain says resounding yes to European constitution
Financial Times: Lessons from Spain's rushed poll

Spain
European
Referendums in Spain
Referendum on the European Constitution, Spanish
Spain
Spain
Spain and the European Union
Spain